The Victory Bowl is the championship football game between schools that sponsor football and are members of the National Christian College Athletic Association and did not qualify for either the NCAA or NAIA playoffs.  It is one of the few post-season bowl games for smaller schools.  Because the NCCAA is not exclusive, it is possible that schools from the NAIA and the NCAA may meet each other in this game, as with the 2008 game.

In addition to the game, other activities include community service projects that involve players and coaches from both teams.

History

Source:

References

External links
Victory Bowl at the NCCAA website
 past results pdf

 
College football bowls
College sports championships in the United States